Iridomyrmex turbineus is a species of ant in the genus Iridomyrmex. Described by Shattuck and McMillan in 1998, the species is endemic to Australia, commonly seen on the coasts of Western Australia.

References

Iridomyrmex
Hymenoptera of Australia
Insects described in 1998